Miss Europe 1964 was the 27th edition of the Miss Europe pageant and the 16th edition under the Mondial Events Organization. It was held at the Casino du Liban in Beirut, Lebanon on 4 June 1964. Elly Konie Koot of Holland, was crowned Miss Europe 1964 by out going titleholder Mette Stenstad of Norway.

Results

Placements

Contestants 

 - Rosita Nowak
 - Danièle Defrère
 - Winnie Beck
 - Brenda Blackler
 - Sirpa Suosmaa
 - Edith Noël
 - Marion Sibylle Zota
 - Kia Limperi
 - Elly Konie Koot
 - Sonja Egilsdóttir
 - Joan Power
 - María Luisa "Marilù" Perini
 - Mariette-Sophie Stephano
 - Jorunn Nystedt
 - Rosa María Ruiz
 - Siv Märta Åberg
 - Sandra Sulser (Sulzer)

Notes

Returns

Withdrawals

References

External links 
 

Miss Europe
1964 beauty pageants
1964 in Lebanon